Quaadir Atkinson, professionally known as Neo da Matrix, is an American hip hop producer from Philadelphia, Pennsylvania. He attended Stone Mountain High School in Stone Mountain, Georgia. He has worked with Swizz Beatz as an in-house producer for Ruff Ryders Entertainment and has produced for the likes of Cassidy.  Neo Da Matrix is currently working on projects for Cassidy, Jadakiss, Swizz Beatz, Young Chris, Eve, Fabolous, Mýa, David Banner, Juelz Santana, Nina Sky, Tru Life, Range and more.

Production credits

2003

Bravehearts – Bravehearted
 "I Will"

2004

Drag-On – Hell and Back
 "Bronx – Skit"
 "Tell Your Friends" (featuring Jadakiss)
 "Hector The Killer MC – Skit" (featuring Capone)
 "Busta – Skit" (featuring Capone)

Jadakiss – Kiss of Death
 "Air It Out"
 "Bring U Down"

Jin – The Rest Is History
 "Get Your Handz Off"
 "Chinese Beats (Skit)"
 "Senorita"
 "Cold Outside" (featuring Lyfe Jennings)

2005

Cassidy – I'm a Hustla
 "On The Grind"
 "A.M. to P.M."
 "6 Minutes" (featuring Lil Wayne and Fabolous)

Juelz Santana – What the Game's Been Missing!
 "Good Times"
 "Mic Check"

4RON – The Start Up
 "Time Wasted"

Ruff Ryders – The Redemption, Vol. 1 (Mixtape)
 "Double R Wit Us" (Pirate)
 "Neo's Shit" (Infa-Red)

Ruff Ryders – The Redemption, Vol. 4
 "If It's Beef..." (Jadakiss, Kartoon, Infa-Red and Flashy)

2006

Fabolous – Back Atcha (Mixtape)
 "Back Atcha" (featuring Swizz Beatz)

Young Chris – The Chain Remains: Rebirth Of A Dynasty (Mixtape)
 "Live"

Styles P – Time Is Money
 "Who Want A Problem" (featuring Swizz Beatz)
 "Who Want A Problem (Remix)" (featuring Swizz Beatz, Jadakiss and Sheek Louch)
 "Kick It Like That" (featuring Jagged Edge)

2007

Tru Life – Tru York (Mixtape)
 "Freestyle Intro" (Performed by Jay-Z)
 "Knives Like" (featuring N.O.R.E.)
 "Get That Paper"

Rihanna – Good Girl Gone Bad
 "Say It"

Hood Environment – Drag-On Presents: Welcome To Hood Environment 01 (Mixtape)
 "Hood Environment Anthem"
 "I Declare War"
 "My Life"

Cassidy – 7.7.7. (Mixtape)
 "I Don't Give A Fuck"

Mario – Go!
 "How Do I Breathe (Remix)" (featuring Fabolous)

Cassidy – B.A.R.S. The Barry Adrian Reese Story
 "Where My Niggaz At"

Swizz Beatz – One Man Band Man
 "The Funeral"

2008

Fabolous – There Is No Competition (Mixtape)
 "Suicide"
 "Fuck Wit' Street Fam" (featuring Neo Da Matrix)
 "Hustlas Poster Child" (featuring Cassidy)
 "Paperman" (featuring Neo Da Matrix)

Memphis Bleek – The Process
 "Hustla" (featuring Neo Da Matrix)

Tru Life – Tru Life
 "I Can't Believe" (featuring Swizz Beatz)

R.Jackman – The Struggle For Power
 "See You" (featuring Cassidy)

Maino – Maino Is The Future (Mixtape)
 "Take You Home"

2009

Jadakiss – The Last Kiss (album)
 "Can't Stop Me"

Rakim – The Seventh Seal (Rakim album)
 "Satisfaction Guaranteed"

2010

Drag-On – My Life, My Legacy, My Melody
 "Money" (featuring Neo Da Matrix)

Other
 "The Warning" Featuring Cashius Green & Pheo

Kidd Domination
 "Aww Man" featuring Cory Gunz, Smoke DZA, Freck Billionaire & Neo Da Matrix

Cassidy
 "You Already Know" featuring Fabolous & Beanie Sigel
 "Time"

Drag-On
 "D.W.I." featuring Sheek Louch

Jin
 "Lord Geezus"

Ruff Ryders
"Do What We Gotta Do (Remix) featuring Infa-Red, Cross & 2Pac
"Money On My Mind" featuring My-My, Drag-On & Flashy

Sin
"Fly Away" featuring Tony Sunshine
"Shake It Mami"

Styles P
 "Gunz Is Out"

Raekwon
"Realer" featuring Maino

Tuge
 "Air It Out" featuring Busta Rhymes

Range
"Go"
"Fool"
"Off The Market"
"Vacancy"
"Flatline"
"Claptomaniac"
"Guess I'm In Luv"
"I Wanna Love You Down"
"Would U Say"
"No One Else"

Ya Boy
 "Do With That Money"
 "The Shit"

Neo Da Matrix
 "Cookie Pop"
 "Never Ending"

References

External links 
 Official MySpace
 Neo da Matrix at AllMusic
 
 

American hip hop record producers
Production discographies
Hip hop discographies
East Coast hip hop musicians
Musicians from Philadelphia
African-American record producers
Living people
Year of birth missing (living people)
Record producers from Pennsylvania
21st-century African-American people